In enzymology, a 2-oxopropyl-CoM reductase (carboxylating) is an enzyme that catalyzes the chemical reaction

2-mercaptoethanesulfonate + acetoacetate + NADP+  2-(2-oxopropylthio)ethanesulfonate + CO2 + NADPH

The 3 substrates of this enzyme are 2-mercaptoethanesulfonate, acetoacetate, and NADP+, whereas its 3 products are 2-(2-oxopropylthio)ethanesulfonate, CO2, and NADPH.

This enzyme belongs to the family of oxidoreductases, specifically those acting on a sulfur group of donors with NAD+ or NADP+ as acceptor.  The systematic name of this enzyme class is 2-mercaptoethanesulfonate, acetoacetate:NADP+ oxidoreductase (decarboxylating). Other names in common use include NADPH:2-(2-ketopropylthio)ethanesulfonate, oxidoreductase/carboxylase, and NADPH:2-ketopropyl-coenzyme M oxidoreductase/carboxylase.

Structural studies

References

 
 

EC 1.8.1
NADPH-dependent enzymes
Enzymes of known structure